Members of Mayday was a German techno project by Klaus Jankuhn and WestBam. From 1991 until 2013 the Members of Mayday created the official hymn of the annual Mayday Rave, which at the time was Germany's largest indoor rave. In February 2014 WestBam left the group.

Discography

Studio albums
 Members Only (1995)
 Anthems Of The Decade (2001)
 All In One (2009)

Singles

References

External links
  of the Mayday party
 

Electronic music duos
German electronic music groups
Hardcore techno music groups